Pokrovka is a rural locality (a selo) and the administrative center of Pokrovsky Selsoviet, Rodinsky District, Altai Krai, Russia. The population was 806 as of 2013. There are 10 streets.

Geography 
Pokrovka is located 36 km northeast of Rodino (the district's administrative centre) by road. Gladen is the nearest rural locality.

References 

Rural localities in Rodinsky District